Rad-Net Oßwald is a German UCI Continental team founded in 2013. It participates in UCI Continental Circuits races.

Team roster

Major wins
2013
Stage 1 Okolo Jižních Čech, Theo Reinhardt
2014
Stage 3 Okolo Jižních Čech, Emanuel Buchmann
2015
Stage 2 Szlakiem Grodów Piastowskich, Pascal Ackermann
Stage 1 Dookoła Mazowsza, Kersten Thiele
Stage 4 Dookoła Mazowsza, Nils Schomber
2016
Prologue Tour de Normandie, Lucas Liss
Stages 2 & 3 Bałtyk–Karkonosze Tour, Maximilian Beyer
UCI Road World Championships under-23 time trial, Marco Mathis
2017
Stage 3 Bałtyk–Karkonosze Tour, Maximilian Beyer
Stage 3 Dookoła Mazowsza, Theo Reinhardt
2018
Stage 2 Tour of Fuzhou, Leon Rohde

World, European & National Champions

2014
 European U23 Track (Madison), Domenic Weinstein
 German Track (Team Pursuit), Henning Bommel
 German Track (Team Pursuit), Kersten Thiele
 German Track (Team Pursuit), Nils Schomber
 German Track (Team Pursuit), Theo Reinhardt
 German Track (Individual Pursuit), Domenic Weinstein
 German Track (Omnium), Theo Reinhardt

2015
 World Track (Scratch race), Lucas Liß
 German Track (Individual Pursuit), Domenic Weinstein
 German Track (Team Pursuit), Domenic Weinstein
 German Track (Team Pursuit), Henning Bommel
 German Track (Team Pursuit), Nils Schomber
 German Track (Team Pursuit), Theo Reinhardt
 German Team Time Trial, Marco Mathis
 German Team Time Trial, Kersten Thiele
 German Team Time Trial, Joshua Stritzinger
 German Team Time Trial, Nils Schomber
 German Team Time Trial, Domenic Weinstein
 German Team Time Trial, Theo Reinhardt

2017
 German Track (Individual Pursuit), Domenic Weinstein
 German Track (Team Pursuit), Kersten Thiele
 German Track (Team Pursuit), Theo Reinhardt
 German Track (Team Pursuit), Lucas Liß
 German Track (Team Pursuit), Domenic Weinstein
 German Track (Madison), Kersten Thiele
 German Track (Madison), Theo Reinhardt
 German Track (Scratch race), Lucas Liß
 German U23 Time Trial, Patrick Haller
 German Track (Scratch race), Leif Lampater

References

External links
 

UCI Continental Teams (Europe)
Cycling teams based in Germany
Cycling teams established in 2013